BKMA Yerevan ( or ; Banaki Kentronakan Marzakan Akumb Yerevan), meaning Central Sport Club of the Army Yerevan, is an Armenian football club based in Yerevan. Their current home stadium is the main training pitch of Vagharshapat Football Academy.

History
During the days of the Soviet rule in Armenia, the Central Sport Club of the Army Yerevan was founded in 1947 in Yerevan. It was commonly known with its Russian abbreviation as CSKA Yerevan.

After the independence of Armenia in 1991, the BKMA made their professional debut in domestic football competitions in the 1994 Armenian First League where they finished 3rd.

In the 1995–96 Armenian First League season, they finished 2nd behind FC Arabkir, to get the opportunity to face Aragats Gyumri in the promotion play-off match in which they beat the Armenian Premier League side and were promoted for the following season. Halfway through the 1997 season, BKMA were folded and all their remaining matches were awarded 3–0 to their opponents, resulting in the 12th and last position and relegation. The club has been inactive ever since.

In 2019, BKMA was revived by the efforts of the Defence minister of Armenia David Tonoyan. The head coach of the team is Rafael Nazaryan, assisted by Varazdat Avetisyan.

Squad

References

Association football clubs established in 1947
BKMA
1947 establishments in Armenia
Military association football clubs
Ministry of Defence (Armenia)